Grega Žemlja was the defending champion but chose not to compete.
Márton Fucsovics won the title by defeating James Ward 7–5, 3–6, 6–3 in the final.

Seeds

Draw

Finals

Top half

Bottom half

References
 Main Draw
 Qualifying Draw

ATP China International Tennis Challenge – Anning - Singles
2013 Singles